Randolph Jerome (born February 2, 1978) is a Guyanese soccer player who currently plays for North East Stars in the TT Pro League.

Career

Professional 
Jerome began his career in Trinidad with Doc’s Khelwalaas, before moving to league rival Caledonia AIA. He transferred to play for North East Stars in 2002 and in 2003 28 goals to lead the league and claim the Golden Boot award.

In the 2004 season, Jerome moved to South Starworld Strikers where he scored 16 goals, second in the league behind Jerren Nixon. After that, Jerome played for 7 months in Lebanon for Al-Mabarra, scoring 10 times in League games and 4 times in the Cup and honouring as Lebanese Cup winner, before returning to Trinidad to play for W Connection and a second stint with South Starworld Strikers.

In January 2006 Jerome made several attempts to break into the US soccer market, attending trials with several clubs, including Virginia Beach Mariners, but was not picked up by any of the teams. He played for the North East Stars again in 2007, before being signed by the Cleveland City Stars in 2008. He helped the Stars to the USL Second Division championship in 2008, before signing for the Pittsburgh Riverhounds for the 2009 season. Following the conclusion of the 2009 USL2 season, Jerome was loaned to Caledonia AIA in the TT Pro League.

International 
Between 1991 and 2003 Jerome played for various men's national teams for Guyana. During his teen years he played for the Under-14, Under-16, and Under-17 teams. He later captained the Under-21 and Under-23 teams, the latter of which he captained during Olympic qualifying in 1999. Jerome played for Guyana in the inter Guyana games in 1995. In 2000, he was capped to the senior national team to represent them in World Cup qualification.

References

External links 
 Player profile at Guyana Football Federation
 
 
 

1978 births
Living people
Guyanese footballers
Guyanese expatriate footballers
Expatriate footballers in Lebanon
Guyana international footballers
USL Second Division players
Cleveland City Stars players
North East Stars F.C. players
TT Pro League players
Morvant Caledonia United players
W Connection F.C. players
South Starworld Strikers F.C. players
Guyanese expatriate sportspeople in Trinidad and Tobago
Expatriate footballers in Trinidad and Tobago
Guyanese expatriate sportspeople in the United States
Expatriate soccer players in the United States
Association football forwards
Guyanese expatriate sportspeople in Lebanon
Lebanese Premier League players
Al Mabarra Club players